Babiana scabrifolia is a perennial plant of  high that annually forms leaves and flowers from an underground corm and is assigned to the Iris family. It produces relatively large, pale lilac or blue flowers slightly above the soil, and soft, lightly pleated leaves that reach beyond the flowers. These leaves are lance-shaped to oblong in adults, but line-shaped and twisted in non-flowering specimens. Flowering occurs from June to August. The species can be found in the Western Cape province of South Africa.

Description 
The stem is mostly underground, simple or branched and enveloped by a thick fibrous collar. The above ground parts are hairy. The blade sits at an angle atop a sheath that envelops the sheaths of higher leaves. 

The inner bract is slightly shorter than the outer and split entirely or almost to the base and has wide transparant margins. The lower lateral lobes are adorned with a cream-coloured or white splash in its basal half accentuated by dark violet to blue and have undulating or crisped margins. Below the perianth tube sits an ovary that is thinly hairy in the upper half, on the ribs or rarely hairless. These style branches widen considerably towards their tips. This species flowers between June and August.

Differences with similar species 
Babiana mucronata occurs in the same area as B. scabrifolia but it has upright stems that reach into the air and are enveloped by a fibrous collar below ground, has floral bracts with dry, rusty brown tips, and much smaller blue-violet flowers with an acrid, unpleasant smell or sometimes scentless. Babiana ambigua lacks a collar of fibres surrounding the underground parts of the stem, and the margins of the lower lateral tepal lobes are plane. B. scabrifolia is equipped with a fibrous collar enveloping the stem, has lower lateral tepal lobes with undulating margins, and a sweet, mostly daffodil-like smell.

Taxonomy and naming 
This species was first described by Friedrich Wilhelm Klatt in 1882, based on a collection made in 1830 by Johann Franz Drège from the Langevallei near Clanwilliam, using a name that had been suggested by Joachim Brehm, who had failed to make a valid description. South African botanist Gwendoline Joyce Lewis published in 1959 an extensive revision of the genus Babiana. Therein she distinguished several forms that apparently reflected variations that reflect differences in soil and microclimate, in particular B. adpressa, B. subglabra, B. scabrifolia var. acuminata and B. scabrifolia var. declinata. Peter Goldblatt and John Charles Manning revised the genus again in 2007, and they regarded all of these names as synonymous.

The species name scabrifolia is derived from the Latin words scabro that means 'to scratch'  and folius that means 'leaf', which together indicate the plant would have rough leaves.

Distribution, ecology and conservation 
Babiana scabrifolia can be found in the north-eastern Cederberg to the Olifants River Valley around Citrusdal and the Nardous Mountains in the Western Cape province of South Africa. Here its grows on stony and sandy lower mountain slopes in dry fynbos and karroo scrubland. It is pollinated by bees, including honey bees. The species readily reproduces by making small corms, which produce line-shaped, twisted leafs that contrast with the soft-textured and wide leaves of the adult corms. It is a locally common species, in particular in the northern parts of its range from Pakhuis Pass to the Nardous Mountains, that is known from over twenty locations. Even though some subpopulations are lost to expanding agriculture, most are safe from habitat loss, partially being in protected areas, and therefore it is unlikely that this species will be driven to extinction in the near future.

References 

scabrifolia
Endemic flora of South Africa
Plants described in 1882